Eucosma haberhaueri is a species of moth of the family Tortricidae. It is found in China (Xinjiang), Uzbekistan, Kyrgyzstan and Kazakhstan.

References

Moths described in 1901
Eucosmini